Kelly Bryan Bennett (born 21 May 1971) is a former Zimbabwean cricketer. Born in Salisbury (now Harare),  he played three first-class matches for Young Mashonaland during the 1995–96 Logan Cup.

References

External links
 
 

1971 births
Living people
Cricketers from Harare
Mashonaland cricketers
Zimbabwean cricketers